"Stop, Look, Listen (to Your Heart)" is a soul song written by Thom Bell and Linda Creed that was originally recorded by the Philadelphia soul group the Stylistics.

The Stylistics original version
An R&B ballad, it was the first track from their 1971 debut self-titled album and was released as a single in 1971 and reached No. 39 on the U.S. Billboard Hot 100 chart. It also climbed to No. 6 in the Billboard R&B chart.

Diana Ross and Marvin Gaye version

Around the same time, Motown wanted their most successful label mates Diana Ross and Marvin Gaye to record a duet album. Among the songs they released, their version of "Stop, Look, Listen (To Your Heart)" was recorded in separate studios, and was released as a UK only single from their duet album, Diana & Marvin, in 1974. The song became a hit in the UK reaching #25 on the UK Singles Chart.

In 2001, the Diana Ross and Marvin Gaye duet version was used as part of the movie soundtrack for Bridget Jones's Diary.

Personnel

The Stylistics version
Lead vocals by Russell Thompkins Jr.
Background vocals by 
Thom Bell,
Carl Helm,
Bunny Sigler,
Kenny Gamble, and 
Phil Hurtt 
Produced by Thom Bell

Diana Ross & Marvin Gaye version
Lead vocals by Diana Ross and Marvin Gaye
Instrumentation by The Funk Brothers
Produced by Hal Davis

References

1971 singles
1973 singles
The Stylistics songs
Diana Ross songs
Marvin Gaye songs
Male–female vocal duets
Songs written by Linda Creed
Songs written by Thom Bell
Motown singles
1971 songs
Avco Records singles
Song recordings produced by Hal Davis